Change is the ninth album of the Japanese pop rock group Every Little Thing, released on March 24, 2010. Mitsuru Igarashi.

Background information 
The band's 36th single "Dream Goes On", was released on September 23, 2009, and marked a highlight as the return of Mitsuru Igarashi working with the band after 9 years. Igarashi had major involvement in the recording of the album; he composed most of its songs, and co-arranged all songs along with Mochida and Ito (minus the instrumentals). As for lyrics, he also wrote "Spearmint", which was previously included as a b-side of "Dream Goes On".

Track listing

Notes
 co-arranged by Every Little Thing
 co-arranged by Ichiro Ito

Charts 

2010 albums
Every Little Thing (band) albums